

Men's Senior Football Team

Record

Managers of 2013
Included just matches against country.

Goal scorers

Fixtures and results

Friendly Matches

International Friendly

Non-FIFA International Friendly

2015 AFC Asian Cup

Qualification (Group C) 

Source:

Men's under-23 Football Team

Record

Managers of 2013
Included just matches against country.

Goal scorers

Fixtures and results

Friendly Matches

International Friendly

Non-International Friendly (against clubs)

2013 Islamic Solidarity Games

Group B 
Source:

Knockout stage

2013 Southeast Asian Games

Group B

Knockout stage

Men's under-19 Football Team

Record

Managers of 2013
Included just matches against country.

Goal scorers

Fixtures and results

Friendly Matches

International Friendly 
Source:

Non-International Friendly (against clubs)

2013 HKFA International Youth Football Invitation Tournament

Result

2013 AFF U-19 Youth Championship

Group stage (group B) 
Source:

Knockout stage

2014 AFC U-19 Championship

Qualification (Group G) 
Source:

Men's under-17 Football Team

Record

Managers of 2013 
Included just matches against country.

Goal scorers

Fixtures and results

Friendly Matches

Non-International Friendly (against clubs)

2013 AFF U-16 Youth Championship

Group stage (group B) 
Source:

Knockout stage 
Source:

2014 AFC U-16 Championship

Qualification (Group J)

Men's under-15 Football Team

Record

Managers of 2013 
Included just matches against country.

Goal scorers

Fixtures and results

Friendly Matches

Non-International Friendly (against clubs)

2014 AFC U-14 Championship

Qualification (Group F) 

Source:

2013 Asian Youth Games

Group stage (group C) 

Source:

Knockout stage

Women's Senior Football Team

Record

Managers of 2013
Included just matches against country.

Goal scorers

Fixtures and results

Friendly Matches

International Friendly

Non-FIFA International Friendly

2013 AFF Women's Championship

Group B 
Source:

References 

2013
2013 in Indonesian football
Indonesia